Venefica is a genus of eels in the duckbill eel family Nettastomatidae. It currently contains the following species:

 Venefica multiporosa Karrer, 1982
 Venefica ocella Garman, 1899
 Venefica proboscidea (Vaillant, 1888) (Whipsnout sorcerer)
 Venefica procera (Goode & T. H. Bean, 1883)
 Venefica tentaculata Garman, 1899

References

 

Nettastomatidae
Taxa named by David Starr Jordan